The Seoul Metropolitan Government is a local government of Seoul, South Korea. The mayor is elected to a four-year term by the citizens of Seoul and is responsible for the administration of the city government. The Seoul Metropolitan Government deals with administrative affairs as the capital city of South Korea. Hence, it is more centralized than that of most other cities, with the city government being responsible for correctional institutions, public education, libraries, public safety, recreational facilities, sanitation, water supply, and welfare services.

In the city government, there are 5 offices, 32 bureaus, and 107 divisions. The headquarters is located in the Seoul City Hall building which is in Taepyeongno, Jung-gu, Seoul. The Government started on September 28, 1946 as the Seoul City Government which became Seoul Metropolitan Government on August 15, 1949. The Seoul Metropolitan Government has one mayor and three vice mayors, with one in charge of political affairs and the other two in charge of administrative affairs. Seoul is subdivided into 25 autonomous gu and 522 administrative dong.

The Seoul Institute (SI), the think tank for the city, was established in 1992 by the Seoul Metropolitan Government. It was formerly known as The Seoul Development Institute (SDI). The SI supports the policy-making processes of the municipal administration by conducting intensive research and cooperating with domestic and foreign research institutes. The SI seeks to collaborate and communicate with the citizens of Seoul "to secure the validity of its various policy researches".

Information disclosure 
In 2011, when Government 2.0 was still a new concept to many, the fifth elected mayor of the City of Seoul, Mr. Wonsoon Park, introduced many policies to promote democracy based on civil participation after his inauguration. As one of his key agenda, he suggested the Governance 2.0, based on the concepts of ‘Communication, Cooperation, and Participation,’ as he established the foundation for promoting citizen participation in the governance of the city and sought to provide all administrative information of the city through the Information Communication Plaza.

Direction of the Information Disclosure Policies 
The City of Seoul discloses all of its administrative information except for that information designated as classified in accordance with the law. Through this policy, the city upholds the rights to information of the citizens, enhances transparency in the administration, and promotes accountability. Also, through the Information Communication Plaza of the city, the metropolitan government gathers up and returns various administrative information to its citizens.

Seoul Information Communication Plaza 
In order to implement our Nude Project successfully, the City of Seoul established the document disclosure system and the Information Communication Plaza in an innovative manner to disclose the administrative information automatically, while allowing the citizens to access the administrative information more easily through smartphones and other devices. As a result, the administrative information of the city is being provided more effectively and substantively.

Internal approval request documents service 
The Information Communication Plaza provides various internal approval request documents of different fields created by the City of Seoul. Especially, in addition to the main office of the City Hall and Business Entities of the city, the users may access the information from the 25 autonomous districts and other organizations funded by the city, allowing access to detailed information the citizens require. Also, the ‘Council Information’ section provides the information on the meetings organized by the City of Seoul from the schedule of the meetings to the minutes. Also, the ‘Policies of Seoul’ section provides the information on the key projects of the city administration and large projects which involve investments more than 10 billion won. This is very helpful for anyone who wishes to access the status information on the various construction projects executed by the city.

See also
Politics of South Korea
Seoul City Hall
The Seoul Institute
Seoul Information Communication Plaza

References

Government of Seoul